Events in the year 1994 in Brazil.

Incumbents

Federal government
 President: Itamar Franco
 Vice President: vacant

Governors 
 Acre: vacant
 Alagoas: Geraldo Bulhões
 Amapa: Annibal Barcellos (until 31 December)
 Amazonas: Gilberto Mestrinho
 Bahia: Antônio Carlos Magalhães then Ruy Trindade then Antônio Imbassahy
 Ceará: 
 until 8 September: Ciro Gomes
 8 September-9 October: Francisco de Barros
 starting 9 October: Francisco Aguiar
 Espírito Santo: Albuíno Cunha de Azeredo 
 Goiás: Iris Rezende (until 2 April); Agenor Rezende (from 2 April)
 Maranhão: Edison Lobão (until 2 April); José de Ribamar Fiquene (from 2 April)
 Mato Grosso: Jaime Campos
 Mato Grosso do Sul: Pedro Pedrossian 
 Minas Gerais: Hélio Garcia 
 Pará: Jader Barbalho (until 2 April); Carlos Santos (from 2 April)
 Paraíba: Ronaldo Cunha Lima (until 2 April); Cícero de Lucena (from 2 April)
 Paraná: Roberto Requião de Mello e Silva then Mario Pereira 
 Pernambuco: Joaquim Francisco Cavalcanti  
 Piauí: Freitas Neto (until 2 April); Guilherme Melo (from 2 April)
 Rio de Janeiro: Leonel Brizola then Nilo Batista
 Rio Grande do Norte: José Agripino Maia (until 2 April); Vivaldo Costa (from 2 April)
 Rio Grande do Sul: Alceu de Deus Collares
 Rondônia: Oswaldo Piana Filho
 Roraima: Ottomar de Sousa Pinto 
 Santa Catarina: Vilson Kleinübing (until 6 April); Antônio Carlos Konder Reis (from 6 April)
 São Paulo: Luís Antônio Fleury Filho 
 Sergipe: João Alves Filho 
 Tocantins: Moisés Nogueira Avelino

Vice governors
 Acre: vacant
 Alagoas: Francisco Roberto Holanda de Melo
 Amapá: Ronaldo Pinheiro Borges 
 Amazonas: Francisco Garcia Rodrigues 
 Bahia: Paulo Souto (until 2 April); Rosalvo Barbosa Romeo (from 2 May)
 Ceará: Lúcio Gonçalo de Alcântara (until 16 September); vacant thereafter (from 16 September)
 Espírito Santo: Adelson Antônio Salvador 
 Goiás: Luís Alberto Maguito Vilela (until 2 April); vacant thereafter (from 2 April)
 Maranhão: José de Ribamar Fiquene (until 2 April); vacant thereafter (from 2 April)
 Mato Grosso: Osvaldo Roberto Sobrinho
 Mato Grosso do Sul: Ary Rigo 
 Minas Gerais: Arlindo Porto Neto 
 Pará: Carlos José Oliveira Santos (until 2 April); vacant thereafter (from 2 April)
 Paraíba: Cícero Lucena Filho (until 2 April); vacant thereafter (from 2 April)
 Paraná: Mario Pereira (until 2 April); vacant thereafter (from 2 April)
 Pernambuco: Carlos Roberto Guerra Fontes 
 Piauí: Guilherme Cavalcante de Melo (until 2 April); vacant thereafter (from 2 April)
 Rio de Janeiro: Nilo Batista (until 2 April); vacant thereafter (from 2 April)
 Rio Grande do Norte: Vivaldo Costa (until 2 April); vacant thereafter (from 2 April)
 Rio Grande do Sul: João Gilberto Lucas Coelho 
 Rondônia: Assis Canuto 
 Roraima: Antônio Airton Oliveira Dias 
 Santa Catarina: Antônio Carlos Konder Reis (until 2 April); vacant thereafter (from 2 April)
 São Paulo: Aloysio Nunes 
 Sergipe: José Carlos Mesquita Teixeira 
 Tocantins: Paulo Sidnei Antunes

Events 
 1 July: The real replaces the cruzeiro real as Brazil's national currency.
 28 October Nightmare Before Christmas O Estranho Mundo de Jack

Deaths 
May 1 Ayrton Senna died in an accident at Imola Italy after hitting a concreate barrier at great speed.

See also 
1994 in Brazilian football
1994 in Brazilian television

References

 
1990s in Brazil
Years of the 20th century in Brazil
Brazil
Brazil